In the women's synchronized 10 metre platform event at the 2015 European Diving Championships, the winning pair were the Russians Yulia Timoshinina and  Ekaterina Petukhova.

Medalists

Results

Green denotes finalists

References

2015 European Diving Championships
Euro